Lithophane adipel is a moth of the family Noctuidae first described by Foster Hendrickson Benjamin in 1936. The wingspan is about 42 mm.

References

adipel
Moths of North America
Moths described in 1936